Clayton may refer to:

People and fictional characters
Clayton (name), a list of people and fictional characters with the surname or given name
Clayton baronets
The Clayton Brothers, Jeff and John, jazz musicians
Clayton Brothers, Rob and Christian, painter artists

Places

Canada
Clayton, Ontario
Rural Municipality of Clayton No. 333, Saskatchewan

Australia
Clayton, Victoria
Clayton Bay, a town in South Australia formerly known as Clayton
Electoral district of Clayton, a former electoral district in Victoria

United Kingdom
Clayton, Manchester
Clayton, South Yorkshire
Clayton, Staffordshire, in Newcastle-under-Lyme
Clayton, West Sussex
Clayton, West Yorkshire

United States
 Clayton, Alabama
 Clay County, Arkansas, formerly "Clayton County"
 Clayton, California, in Contra Costa County
 Clayton, Placer County, California
 Clayton, Delaware
 Clayton, Georgia, a city in Rabun County
 Clayton County, Georgia
 Clayton, Idaho
 Clayton, Illinois
 Clayton, Indiana
 Clayton County, Iowa
 Clayton, Iowa, a city
 Clayton, Kansas
 Clayton, Louisiana
 Clayton, Maryland
 Clayton, Massachusetts
 Clayton, Michigan, a village in Lenawee County
 Clayton Township, Arenac County, Michigan
 Clayton Township, Genesee County, Michigan
 Clayton, Minnesota, in Faribault County
 Clayton Township, Mower County, Minnesota
 Clayton, Mississippi
 Clayton, Missouri
 Clayton, New Jersey
 Clayton, New Mexico
 Clayton (town), New York
 Clayton (village), New York
 Clayton, North Carolina
 Clayton, Ohio
 Clayton, Oklahoma
 Clayton, Pennsylvania
 Clayton, South Dakota
 Clayton, Texas
 Clayton, Washington
 Clayton, West Virginia
 Clayton, Wisconsin (disambiguation), multiple locations

Companies
 Clayton Aniline Company, a British chemical company
 Clayton Equipment Company, a British engineering company
 Clayton, Dubilier & Rice, a private investment firm
 Clayton & Shuttleworth, a British engineering company

Schools
 Clayton State University, an accredited, reputable university in Georgia, US
 Clayton College of Natural Health, a non-accredited distance-learning college in Alabama, US
 Clayton High School (disambiguation)
 Claytons Primary School, Bourne End, Buckinghamshire, England, UK

Other uses
 Clayton (software), a Wayland compositor using the Clutter toolkit
 "Clayton", Pittsburgh, Pennsylvania, USA; the main structure of Frick Art & Historical Center
 Clayton Congregational Church, later Clayton Wesley Uniting Church, a church building in Adelaide, South Australia, Australia
 Claytons, a non-alcoholic drink, formerly "Clayton Bros."
 British Rail Class 17, a class of Diesel locomotive nicknamed "Claytons"

See also

 
 Brothers Clayton (disambiguation)
 Clayton-le-Dale, Lancashire
 Clayton-le-Moors, Lancashire
 Clayton-le-Woods, Lancashire 
 Clayton's case, a legal precedent
 Claydon (disambiguation)
 Claytonville (disambiguation)
 Claiton (disambiguation)
 Cleyton (disambiguation)